Acer pictum subsp. mono, commonly known as painted maple or mono maple in English,  or  in Japan, wu jiao feng in China, or gorosoe or gorosoenamu in Korea,  is a species of maple.

Description
Acer pictum subsp. mono grows 15-20m tall and a trunk that is 60–100 cm wide. Its leaves have 5-7 lobes.

Taxonomy
The tree has the following synonyms:
 Acer laetum var. parviflorum Regel
 Acer mono Maxim. (basionym)
 Acer pictum var. mono (Maxim.) Maxim. ex Franch.
 Acer truncatum subsp. mono (Maxim.) A. E. Murray

Distribution
The tree is native to Japan, Korea, China, Mongolia, and the Russian Far East.

References

 Aceraceae Acer pictum Thunb. subsp. mono (	 Maxim. ) H.Ohashi, International Plant Names Index
Acer mono - Maxim., Plants For A Future, 1996–2008.

pictum subsp. mono
Plant subspecies